Words on Bathroom Walls is a 2020 American coming-of-age romantic drama film directed by Thor Freudenthal and written by Nick Naveda, based on the novel of the same name by Julia Walton. The film stars Charlie Plummer, Andy García, Taylor Russell, AnnaSophia Robb, Beth Grant, Molly Parker and Walton Goggins.

Words on Bathroom Walls was released on August 21, 2020, by Roadside Attractions. It received generally positive reviews from critics.

Plot

High school senior Adam Petrazelli experiences a psychotic break at school, accidentally burning someone's arm. Diagnosed with schizophrenia, he first self-treats by intense focus on cooking, which calms him. His symptoms - chiefly hallucinating with three people and a scary deep 'dark' voice - worsen until he is put on a drug trial. 

His three regular 'visitors' often come at stressful times: Rebecca (new age hippie), Joaquin (the smutty best friend) and "The Bodyguards" (over-protective and often violent), as well as the deep, 'dark' threatening voice, which represents Adam's fears of the unknown.

Adam is expelled and transferred to St. Agatha's Catholic School. There he meets Maya, a feisty, intelligent girl, who fakes other students' assignments for money, supposedly to help people. Adam gets Maya to tutor him and finds she helps him feel better, so he takes his new medication regularly. This reduces his visions with only the minor side effect of muscle twitching. He takes Maya out for food, but resists telling her about his condition, fearing she would no longer want to spend time with him. 

Maya gets caught by the school faking assignments and isn't expelled because she is so clever. Adam visits Maya's home when she doesn't turn up to tutor. In a poor neighbourhood, once Maya realises he doesn't care, she continues tutoring him. He comes to the restaurant where she works part-time to correct his homework, and she invites him to cook something there as a reward. But, when Maya tastes what he made, it is far too spicy, which shows Adam the medication is affecting his tastebuds.

After having another psychotic episode during dinner with his mom, Adam stops taking the new pills. At an outdoor screening of Maya's favorite movie, Never Been Kissed, where Rebecca and Joaquin encourage him to express feelings to Maya, the deep voice starts to prey on his insecurity. Adam admits to having insecurity over his mother having another kid with Paul. Then he asks Maya to prom, even though she's against it. She accepts, and they have their first kiss. His work gets so much better that he writes an essay selected to be read at graduation.

When his mother finds out Adam has stopped his medication, she berates him. Sister Catherine is told by his mom and stepdad, of this and of the incident at his last school. So, he is suspended temporarily, rather than expulsed, for the students' safety. Adam lashes out at Paul, believing his email he wrote to Sister Catherine the previous night, is why. 

The suspension also means Adam can't go to prom, but he goes anyway. He meets Maya there, but as they dance, he is plagued by the deep voice while Sister Catherine tries to kick him out. As his vision goes erratic, Adam pushes the nun to the ground and runs to the catwalk, falling over the edge.

Adam wakes in the hospital to see Beth and Paul. Maya soon shows up, but he breaks down when the visions overwhelm him. He is expelled from St. Agatha's and placed in a psych ward. Father Patrick visits, despite their earlier encounter where Adam was rude. He hadn't been aware of Adam's struggles, Adam apologizes and joins Father Patrick in prayer.

Beth brings Adam a printed copy of Paul's email he sent to St. Agatha's. Contrary to what Adam thought, Paul  supported his stepson. He wrote that suspending him was cruel, and they must show more care for Adam's condition. Realizing how much Paul cares, Adam runs to catch up with him and Beth, hugging Paul for the first time, showing he accepts him as a father figure.

Beth and Paul take Adam to graduation, where, despite Sister Catherine's attempt to stop him, Father Patrick supports him. The deep-voiced black cloud tries to get Adam, but he gathers the courage to address the student body calmly. He quotes his essay in which he discusses both his condition and battle with schizophrenia, declaring that he now knows that his life will not be defined by his illness. After he leaves the auditorium, Maya runs after him. Adam apologizes for not telling her about his illness, at which point they express their mutual love. Joaquin then encourages Adam to kiss Maya, which he does.

With the voices still pestering him, Adam becomes a good big brother to his half sister and gets accepted into culinary school.

Cast
 Charlie Plummer as Adam Petrazelli
 Taylor Russell as Maya Arnez
 Andy García as Father Patrick
 AnnaSophia Robb as Rebecca
 Beth Grant as Sister Catherine
 Devon Bostick as Joaquin
 Lobo Sebastian as The Bodyguard
 Molly Parker as Beth Petrazelli
 Walton Goggins as Paul
 Drew Scheid as Ted
 Ellie Dusek as Saccharine Girl
 Saniya Holmes as Extra

Production
In February 2018, Thor Freudenthal was announced as the film's director, from a screenplay by Nick Naveda, based on the novel of the same name by Julia Walton, with LD Entertainment producing. In March 2018, Charlie Plummer and Taylor Russell were set to star in the film. In April 2018, Andy García, Molly Parker, Walton Goggins, AnnaSophia Robb, and Devon Bostick also joined the cast. The Chainsmokers and Andrew Hollander composed the film's score, the first time the band has scored a film. The trailer features The Chainsmokers' 2019 single "Push My Luck."

Principal photography began in May 2018. The film was shot in Wilmington, North Carolina.

Release
In June 2020, Roadside Attractions acquired distribution rights to the film and set it for an August 7, 2020, release. The release date was later pushed forward a week, with the film newly scheduled for July 31, 2020. The film's official website later removed the release date, with "in theaters this summer" in its place. The trailer premiered on July 15, 2020, and the film was released to theaters on August 21, 2020.

Reception

Box office 
Opening as one of the first new films in wide release during the COVID-19 pandemic, on August 21, 2020, the film made $462,050 from 925 theaters in its first weekend (an average of $499 per venue), finishing third at the box office. 54% of the audience was female, with 62% being between the ages 18–34. The film expanded to 1,395 theaters in its second weekend, and grossed $453,000, then made $282,000 from 1,168 theaters in its third.

Critical response 
The site's critics consensus reads, "Sensitive, well-acted, and solidly directed, Words on Bathroom Walls is an admirable addition to a genre that too rarely does justice to its worthy themes." On Metacritic, the film has a weighted average score of 61 out of 100, based on 12 critics, indicating "generally favorable reviews." Audiences polled by CinemaScore gave the film an average grade of "A" on an A+ to F scale, while PostTrak reported 81% of filmgoers gave it a positive score.

Nick Naveda received a nomination for the Best Adapted Screenplay Award from the Chlotrudis Society for Independent Films.

Soundtrack album 
The Words on Bathroom Walls soundtrack album, including the soundtrack and score, was produced by Andrew Hollander featuring the Chainsmokers, and released on August 21, 2020.

References

External links
 

2020 films
2020s teen drama films
American teen drama films
American coming-of-age drama films
2020s coming-of-age drama films
Films based on American novels
Roadside Attractions films
LD Entertainment films
2020 independent films
Films directed by Thor Freudenthal
Films shot in North Carolina
2020s English-language films
2020 romantic drama films
Films about schizophrenia
2020s American films